Białawoda refers to the following places in Poland:

 Białawoda, Lesser Poland Voivodeship
 Białawoda, Lublin Voivodeship